Fangcun may refer to the following in China:

Fangcun, Guangzhou (芳村), area of Guangzhou that formerly constituted Fangcun District
Fangcun, Anhui (方村镇), town in Jinghu District, Wuhu
Fangcun, Hebei (方村镇), town in Yuhua District, Shijiazhuang
Fangcun, Jiangsu (房村镇), town in Tongshan District, Xuzhou
Fangcun, Shandong (房村镇), town in Daiyue District, Tai'an
Fangcun, Zhejiang (芳村镇), town in Zhejiang